Homer Peter Snyder (December 6, 1863 – December 30, 1937) was an American politician and businessman from New York. Snyder began his business career in the knitting industry, moved to bicycle manufacturing. He left the company to began a political career, entering congress in 1915 and holding office until 1925. He became known for his advocacy on behalf of Native Americans, chairing the Committee on Indian Affairs and introducing the Indian Citizenship Act in 1924.

Biography 

Born in Amsterdam, Montgomery County, New York, he attended the common schools and was employed in various capacities in knitting mills until 1887. He moved to Little Falls in 1887 and continued employment in knitting mills; he engaged in the manufacture of knitting machinery in 1890 and, later, of bicycles and other wheeled vehicles. Snyder co-founded a bicycle manufacturing firm with Michael Fisher in 1895. Three years later Fisher left the company, and Snyder incorporated it as the H. P. Snyder Manufacturing Company. Snyder led this company until 1913.  He was director and vice president of the Little Falls National Bank and served one term as school commissioner in 1895 and two terms as fire and police commissioner of Little Falls in 1910 and 1911.

He was an unsuccessful candidate for election in 1912 to the Sixty-third Congress, and was elected as a Republican to the Sixty-fourth and to the four succeeding Congresses, holding office from March 4, 1915 to March 3, 1925. He was chairman of the Committee on Indian Affairs (Sixty-sixth through Sixty-eighth Congresses) and a member of the Committee on World War Veterans' Legislation (Sixty-eighth Congress).  On the former committee, his most significant achievement was sponsoring the landmark Indian Citizenship Act of 1924 (also called the Snyder Act), which granted citizenship to all of the United States' Indian population. An obituary of Snyder published in The New York Times described him as "one of the outstanding and outspoken champions" of Native Americans.

Snyder was a delegate to the Republican National Conventions in 1916 and 1920 and was not a candidate for reelection in 1924. He resumed his former manufacturing pursuits and in 1937 died at his home in Little Falls; interment was in the Church Street Cemetery.

References

Bibliography

External links 
 

1863 births
1937 deaths
People from Amsterdam, New York
Republican Party members of the United States House of Representatives from New York (state)